Héctor Mata  (born ) is a Venezuelan male volleyball player. He was part of the Venezuela men's national volleyball team at the 2014 FIVB Volleyball Men's World Championship in Poland. He played with Deportivo Anzoátegui.

Clubs
  Deportivo Anzoátegui (2014)

References

1993 births
Living people
Venezuelan men's volleyball players
Place of birth missing (living people)
Volleyball players at the 2020 Summer Olympics
Olympic volleyball players of Venezuela
21st-century Venezuelan people